Anthonius Petrus Lurling (born 22 April 1977), simply known as Anthony Lurling, is a Dutch former footballer who played as an attacking midfielder.

Lurling played for high level clubs like Feyenoord, NAC Breda and 1. FC Köln. For the Jong Oranje team he earned eight caps between 1997 and 2000.

Honours
Den Bosch
Eerste Divisie: 1998–99

SC Heerenveen
Eredivisie: Runners-up 1999–2000

References

External links
 Voetbal International profile 
 
 

1977 births
Living people
Sportspeople from 's-Hertogenbosch
Association football forwards
Dutch footballers
Netherlands under-21 international footballers
Dutch expatriate footballers
RKC Waalwijk players
NAC Breda players
Feyenoord players
SC Heerenveen players
FC Den Bosch players
1. FC Köln players
Bundesliga players
Eredivisie players
Eerste Divisie players
Expatriate footballers in Germany
Dutch expatriate sportspeople in Germany
Footballers from North Brabant